Lissimas is a genus of biting horseflies of the family Tabanidae.

Species
Lissimas australis (Ricardo, 1915)
Lissimas fenestratus Enderlein, 1922
Lissimas moestus Szilády, 1926
Lissimas moluccensis Mackerras, 1964
Lissimas papuensis Mackerras, 1971
Lissimas parallelus (Walker, 1861)
Lissimas pechumani Philip, 1959
Lissimas philipi Mackerras, 1964

References

Tabanidae
Diptera of Asia
Diptera of Australasia
Taxa named by Günther Enderlein
Brachycera genera